White Shoulders is a lost 1922 American silent drama film starring Katherine MacDonald that was directed by Tom Forman. It was produced by B. P. Schulberg and released through Associated First National, later First National Pictures.

Cast
Katherine MacDonald - Virginia Pitman
Lillian Lawrence - Mrs. Pitman, Virginia's Mother
Tom Forman - Robert Lee Pitman - Virginia's Brother
Bryant Washburn - Cole Hawkins
Nigel Barrie - Clayborne Gordon
Charles K. French - Colonel Jim Singleton
James O. Barrows - Judge Blakelock
Richard Headrick - Little Jimmie Blakelock
Fred Malatesta - Maurice, A Modiste
Lincoln Stedman - Cupid Calvert
William De Vaull - Uncle Enoch

Production
Scenes were filmed at the Hotel Del Monte in Monterey, California.

Gallery

References

External links

 

Lobby card

1922 films
American silent feature films
Lost American films
Films directed by Tom Forman
First National Pictures films
Preferred Pictures films
1922 drama films
Silent American drama films
American black-and-white films
1922 lost films
Lost drama films
1920s American films